The Good Humor Man is a 1950 comedy crime film directed by Lloyd Bacon and written by Frank Tashlin. The film revolves around a Good Humor ice cream salesman who becomes involved in a murder. The film stars Jack Carson, Lola Albright, Jean Wallace, George Reeves, Peter Miles and Frank Ferguson. The film was released on June 1, 1950, by Columbia Pictures.

Plot summary
 
Jack Carson plays Good Humor delivery driver Biff Jones, who gets in trouble with the law after being falsely connected with a $300,000 robbery of the cash safe at work, and an apparent murder. He is in love with a neighborhood gal, Margie Bellew, who lives with her younger brother Johnny. Biff and Margie, with the help of Johnny and all the kids from the neighborhood, absolve Biff by fighting and capturing the gangsters guilty of the crime.

Cast
 Jack Carson as Biff Jones
 Lola Albright as Margie Bellew
 Jean Wallace as Bonnie Conroy
 George Reeves as Stuart Nagle
 Peter Miles as Johnny Bellew
 Frank Ferguson as Inspector Quint
 David Sharpe as Slick
 Chick Collins as Fats
 Eddie Parker as John
 Pat Flaherty as Officer Rhodes
 Richard Egan as Officer Daley
 Arthur Space as Steven
 Victoria Horne as Bride
 Jack Overman as Shirtless Stoker

Reception
The New York Times critic Bosley Crowther panned the film, writing "it does nothing to enhance the reputations of either the movies or a national confectioner's brand." Critic Craig Butler described the film as "a surprisingly engaging little slapstick flick" with a "screenplay [that] is silly and contrived". Henry MacArthur of the Washington Evening Star wrote, "a plot that makes sense is not what you want when you set out to see people clouted with custard pies", and called it "one of the wildest sessions of sustained slaptick on record"... "guided at a rising pitch by director Lloyd Bacon".

References

External links
 
 
 
 
 Captain Marvel and the Good Humor Man tie-in comic book

American crime comedy films
American black-and-white films
Columbia Pictures films
Films based on short fiction
Films directed by Lloyd Bacon
1950s crime comedy films
Films with screenplays by Frank Tashlin
Films scored by Heinz Roemheld
1950 comedy films
1950 films
1950s English-language films
1950s American films
Captain Marvel (DC Comics)
Films about salespeople